Mohammad Hossein-Zadeh Hejazi (20 January 1956 – 18 April 2021) was a military commander in Iran's Islamic Revolutionary Guard Corps.

Early life and education
Hejazi was born in Isfahan in 1956. He attended the University of Tehran.

Career
Hejazi became a member of the Islamic Revolutionary Guard Corps in May 1979. He served as the intelligence and security advisor to the Supreme Leader Ali Khamenei. He was a former commander of Basij, the auxiliary Iranian paramilitary branch of the Islamic Revolutionary Guards Corps. On January 20, 2020, he became the Deputy Commander of the Quds Force, by decree of the Supreme Leader, Ali Khamenei.

Allegations
It is alleged by the American Jewish Committee that Hejazi, while serving as an advisor to Khamanei, attended a meeting in August 1993 to plan the AMIA bombing in Argentina along with Khamanei, Rafsanjani, then president, Ali Fallahian, then intelligence minister, and Ali Akbar Velayati, then foreign minister.

The subject was the deputy commander of the Islamic Revolutionary Guard Corps in 2008 and the commander of Tehran's Tharallah military base whose units were central to the government efforts to combat the 2009 Iranian presidential election protests.

Sanctions
In 2010, the United States Department of State had placed Hejazi on its sanctions list. Similarly, the European Union also sanctioned him in October 2011 for playing a "central role in the post-election crackdown."

Death
Hejazi died on April 18, 2021. It was reported that the cause of his death was announced as a heart condition although state media reports that he died of the chemical effects.

References

1956 births
Islamic Revolutionary Guard Corps brigadier generals
2021 deaths
Military personnel from Isfahan